Pierre Pansu (born 13 July 1959) is a French mathematician and a member of the Arthur Besse group and a close collaborator of Mikhail Gromov. He is a professor at the Université Paris-Sud 11 and the École Normale Supérieure in Paris. His main research field is geometry. His contribution to mathematics was celebrated by a double event (a conference and a workshop) co-organized for his 60th birthday by the Clay Mathematics Institute.

Pierre Pansu is the grandson of French physician Félix Esclangon, and the great grand-nephew of mathematician and astronomer Ernest Esclangon, inventor of the talking clock, and brother of Robert Pansu, chemist and research director at CNRS.

See also
Metric Structures for Riemannian and Non-Riemannian Spaces
Pansu derivative

References
.
 Prix Georges Charpak 2013, Académie des Sciences, France.

External links
Pansu's website at Université Paris-Sud 11

References 

1959 births
Living people
20th-century French mathematicians
21st-century French mathematicians
Academic staff of the École Normale Supérieure
International Mathematical Olympiad participants
Research directors of the French National Centre for Scientific Research